Nord 3.401 à 3.512 were 0-6-0 locomotives for mixed traffic of the Chemins de Fer du Nord.
The locomotive class served for more than 50 years, with the last locomotive, Nord 3.486, retiring in 1936.

Construction history
The design was based on  the preceding Nord 3.021 to 3.075 class. The locomotives were built in two series by various manufacturers.

Service history
The locomotives were used to operate many of the Chemins de Fer du Nord's railway lines, passenger trains as well as freight trains. 

In 1914 three locomotives stationed in the depot Tergenier, Nord 3.414, 3.418 and 3.508, were lost due to World War I.
In the period of 1915-1917 the locomotives then were confined to the depots La Chapelle, La Plaine, Creil, Hazebrouck, Dunkerque, Calais, Amiens, Boulogne, Compiègne, Longueau, Béthune, Abbeville and Valenciennes.

In 1918 a locomotive of this series, the Nord 3.438, was used to pull the Armistice train to the Forest of Compiègne.

Early 1920 to 1925 the locomotives were then allocated to the depots La Plaine (4), Creil (3), Crépy (2), Soissons (2), Compiègne (8), Estrées (4), Somain (18), Arras, Délivrance (1), Amiens (7), Longueau (2), Le Tréport (12), Beauvais (3), Cambrai (8), Hirson (11) and Hazebrouck (26).

In 1936 the last operational locomotive of the series, the Nord 3.486, retired.

References

Bibliography

External links

 ETH-Bibliothek Zürich, Bildarchiv. Nord 3.478 (SACM no. 4222, 1890), viewer
 ETH-Bibliothek Zürich, Bildarchiv. Nord 3.408, viewer

Steam locomotives of France
3.401
0-6-0 locomotives
Railway locomotives introduced in 1883